Pinks Branch is a  long 2nd order tributary to the Leipsic River in Kent County, Delaware.

Variant names
According to the Geographic Names Information System, it has also been known historically as:  
Pinks Creek
Wolfpit Branch

Course
Pinks Branch rises on the Fork Branch divide about 0.1 miles southwest of Shorts Corner, Delaware.

Watershed
Pinks Branch drains  of area, receives about 44.8 in/year of precipitation, has a topographic wetness index of 616.66 and is about 6.5% forested.

See also
List of rivers of Delaware

Maps

References 

Rivers of Delaware
Rivers of Kent County, Delaware